Danwar (also rendered Danuwar, Denwar, Dhanvar, Dhanwar) is a language spoken in parts of Nepal by an Indo-Aryan ethnic group of fifty thousand. It is close to Bote-Darai but otherwise unclassified within the Indo-Aryan languages.
A variety called Danwar Rai, It is not related to the Rai of the Tibeto-Burman family.

References

Languages of Nepal
Indo-Aryan languages